Talagang Tehsil (تلا گنگ تحصیل), is a tehsil of Talagang District in the Punjab province of Pakistan. Talagang city is its headquartere.

Administrative divisions
Local government under plga 2019  tehsil is subdivided into 19 Union Councils and 1 Municipal Committee.

 Union Councils 

BHILOMAR

BIDHER

BUDHIAL

Dhermund

DHOULAR

JABBI SHAH DILAWAR

JASSIAL

JHATLA

KOT SARANG

MALIKWAL

MULTAN KHURD

NAKA KAHOOT

NIRGHEE

PIERA FATEHIAL

SAGHAR

TAMMAN

TEHI

THOA MEHRAM KHAN 1

THOA MEHRAM KHAN 2
 City
Talagang

References 

Tehsils of Punjab, Pakistan
Talagang District